The 2000 Asian Junior Men's Volleyball Championship was held in Azadi Volleyball Hall, Tehran, Iran from 18 August to 25 August 2000.

Pools composition
The teams are seeded based on their final ranking at the 1998 Asian Junior Men's Volleyball Championship.

Preliminary round

Pool A

|}

|}

Pool B

|}

|}

Pool C

|}

|}

Pool D

|}

|}

Quarterfinals
 The results and the points of the matches between the same teams that were already played during the preliminary round shall be taken into account for the Quarterfinals.

Pool E

|}

|}

Pool F

|}

|}

Pool G

|}

|}

Pool H

|}

|}

Final round
 The results and the points of the matches between the same teams that were already played during the previous rounds shall be taken into account for the final round.

Classification 9th–12th

|}

|}

Classification 5th–8th

|}

|}

Championship

|}

|}

Final standing

External links
 www.jva.or.jp

A
V
Asian men's volleyball championships
International volleyball competitions hosted by Iran
Asian Junior